The Australian National Science Fiction Convention or Natcon is an annual science fiction convention. Each convention is run by a different committee unaffiliated with any national fannish body. Bids for running the Natcon are voted on by attendees at the Natcon two years in advance. These votes are held at a Business Meeting organised by the convention committee, and held at the convention, in practice much of the organisation of the meeting is done by a standing committee selected by the prior meeting.

Ditmar Award

The Ditmar Award has been awarded at the convention since 1969 to recognise achievement in Australian science fiction (including fantasy and horror) and science fiction fandom. The award is similar to the Hugo Award but on a national rather than international scale. At various times in its history the award has included international categories, but this is the exception. Categories include both professional and fan categories, focusing on fiction but also including some artistic and general achievement (as well as, since the demise of the ASFMAs, several "production" awards).

List of Australian National Science Fiction Conventions

References

Australian science fiction
Science fiction conventions in Australia